Yao Li (要離) was a famed assassin of the state of Wu in the Spring and Autumn period of ancient China. He was recommended to King Helü of Wu by Minister Wu Zixu. His mission was to kill Prince Qingji, who was taking refuge in the state of Wei. In order to pretend to be a criminal in the state of Wu, Yao Li killed his wife and his mother, and his right hand was cut off by King Helü. After his arrival in the state of Wei, he met Qingji and was able to stay in the same boat with his target. As the boat reached the middle of the river, he killed Qingji with a lance and then committed suicide.

References

Zhou dynasty people
Chinese assassins
Murder–suicides in China
Wu (state)
6th-century BC Chinese people
Ancient people who committed suicide
Suicides in China